The 2011 Formula Renault 2.0 Northern European Cup (a Formula Renault motor racing championship), was the sixth Formula Renault 2.0 Northern European Cup season, a one-make formula series held across Europe. The season began at Hockenheimring on 17 April and finished on 25 September at Monza, after 20 races at 8 events. The championship was won by the Spanish driver Carlos Sainz, Jr. His team, Finnish Koiranen,  secured the teams' championship.

Drivers and teams

Race calendar and results
The nine event provisional calendar for the 2011 season was announced on 25 November 2010. The final calendar consisting of eight events and 20 races was confirmed in January.

Championship standings

Drivers' Championship
 Championship points were awarded on a 30, 24, 20, 17, 16, 15, 14, 13, 12, 11, 10, 9, 8, 7, 6, 5, 4, 3, 2, 1 to the top 20 classified finishers in each race.

Teams' Championship
 Championship points were awarded on a 30, 24, 20, 17, 16, 15, 14, 13, 12, 11, 10, 9, 8, 7, 6, 5, 4, 3, 2, 1 to the top 20 classified finishers in each race.

References

External links
 Official website of the Formula Renault 2.0 NEC championship

NEC
Formula Renault 2.0 NEC
Formula Renault 2.0 NEC
Renault NEC